Łukasz Sułkowski (born 18 September 1972) is a Polish professor of economic sciences, specializing in management sciences. Currently employed in the Institute of Public Affairs of the Jagiellonian University, vice-president for international affairs of the Polish Accreditation Committee and Director of Clark University Branch Campus at University of Social Sciences in Poland. He is also the President of PCG Polska.

Career 
Łukasz Sułkowski graduated from Nicolaus Copernicus High School in Łódź and got a master's degree in sociology at the University of Łódź. In 1999 he obtained his PhD in economic sciences, in 2003 he got the DSc degree, and in 2010 he became professor of economics at the Wrocław University of Economics. In 2014 he received the DSc degree in humanities at the Jagiellonian University.

Selected publications 
Łukasz Sułkowski is the author and co-author of more than 300 scientific publications in the area of management and theory of organizations in 1999-2017, including monograph studies, publications in world-wide and national journals, chapters in collective works published in Polish, English and French.

Academic books 
 Sułkowski, Łukasz (2017), Fuzje uczelni. Czy w szaleństwie jest metoda, Warszawa: Wydawnictwo Naukowe PWN, .
 Sułkowski, Łukasz (2016), Kultura akademicka. Koniec utopii, Warszawa: Wydawnictwo Naukowe PWN, .
 Sułkowski, Łukasz, Chmielecki, Michał (red.) (2017), Metaphors in Management – Blend of Theory and Practice, Series: New Horizons in Management Sciences, Volume 5, Frankfurt am Main: Peter Lang International,  (online), .
 Sułkowski, Łukasz (red.) (2013), Epistemology of Management, Series: New Horizons in Management Sciences, Volume 2, Frankfurt am Main: Peter Lang International, .
 Sułkowski, Łukasz (2012), Epistemologia i metodologia zarządzenia, Warszawa: Polskie Wydawnictwo Ekonomiczne (PWE), .
 Sułkowski, Łukasz (2012), Neodarwinism in Organization and Management, Series: New Horizons in Management Sciences, Volume 1, Frankfurt am Main: Peter Lang International, .
 Sułkowski, Łukasz (2009), Firmy rodzinne – jak osiągnąć sukces w sztafecie pokoleń, Warszawa: Wydawnictwo Poltext, .

Scientific papers and chapters 
 Sułkowski, Łukasz (2017), The Culture of Control in the Contemporary University, [in:] The Future of University Education, Izak, Michał, Kostera, Monika, Zawadzki, Michał (ed.), seria: Palgrave Critical University Studies, pp. 85–108, Cham: Springer International Publishing, .
 Sułkowski, Łukasz (2017), Social Capital, Trust and Intercultural Interactions, [in:] Intercultural Interactions in the Multicultural Workplace. Traditional and Positive Organizational Scholarship, Rozkwitalska, Małgorzata, Sułkowski, Łukasz, Magala, Slawomir (ed.), pp. 155–171, Cham: Springer International Publishing, .
 Sułkowski, Łukasz, Chmielecki, Michał (2017), Application of Neuroscience in Management, [in:] Neuroeconomic and Behavioral Aspects of Decision Making: Proceedings of the 2016 Computational Methods in Experimental Economics (CMEE) Conference, Nermend, Kesra, Łatuszyńska, Małgorzata (ed.), pp. 49–62, Cham: Springer International Publishing, .
 Sułkowski, Łukasz, Chmielecki, Michał (2017), Positive Cross-Cultural Scholarship Research,, [in:] Intercultural Interactions in the Multicultural Workplace. Traditional and Positive Organizational Scholarship, Rozkwitalska, Małgorzata, Sułkowski, Łukasz, Magala, Slawomir (ed.), pp. 19–35, Cham: Springer International Publishing, .
 Sułkowski, Łukasz (2017), Understanding Organizational Intercultural Interactions in Corporations, [in:] Intercultural Interactions in the Multicultural Workplace. Traditional and Positive Organizational Scholarship, Rozkwitalska, Małgorzata, Sułkowski, Łukasz, Magala, Slawomir (ed.), pp. 3–17, Cham: Springer International Publishing, .
 Sułkowski, Łukasz, Kaczorowska–Spychalska Dominika (2016), Management of Enterprise of the Future in the Ecosystem of the Internet of Things, [in:] Advances in Ergonomics of Manufacturing: Managing the Enterprise of the Future, Schlick, Christopher Marc, Trzcieliński, Stefan (ed.), pp. 179–191, Cham: Springer International Publishing,  (druk),  (online).
 Rozkwitalska, Malgorzata, Chmielecki, Michał, Przytuła, Sylwia, Sułkowski, Łukasz, Basińska, Beata, Aleksandra (2017), Intercultural interactions in multinational subsidiaries: employee accounts of „The dark side” and „The bright side” of Intercultural contacts, [in:] Baltic Journal of Managenemt, Volume 12, Issue 2, pp. 214–239, Emerald Group Publishing Limited, .
 Chmielecki, Michał, Sułkowski, Łukasz (2017), Goal vs. Relationship-Based Approach. A Comparative Study between American, Chinese, and Polish Negotiators, [in:] Approaches to conflict. Theoretical, Interpersonal, and Discursive Dynamics, Barbara Lewandowska-Tomaszczyk, Paul A. Wilson, Stephen M. Croucher, Lexington Books (ed.), pp. 93–110, London: Lexington Books, .
 Raczkowski, Konrad, Sułkowski, Łukasz, Fijałkowska, Justyna (2016), Comparative Critical Review of Corporate Social Responsibility Business Managenent Models, [in:] International Journal of Contemporary Management, Volume 15, Number 2/2016, pp. 123–150, Kraków: Wydawnictwo Uniwersytet Jagielloński Wydział Zarządzania i Komunikacji Społecznej, .
 Sułkowski, Łukasz (2013), Paradygmaty nauk o zarządzaniu, [in:] International Journal of Contemporary Management Quarterly 2/2013, Wydanie I, Kożuch, Barbara (ed.), pp. 17–26, Kraków: Wydawnictwo Uniwersytet Jagielloński, Wydział Zarządzania i Komunikacji Społecznej, .
 Sułkowski, Łukasz (2012), Meta-paradigmatic Cognitive Perspective in Management Studies, [in:] Argumenta Oeconomica, Tom 22, nr 2, pp. 33–51, Wrocław: Wydawnictwo Uniwersytetu Ekonomicznego we Wrocławiu, .
 Sułkowski, Łukasz (2014), From Fundamentalistic to Pluralistic Epistemology of Organizational Culture, [in:] Tamara – Journal of Critical Organization Inquiry, Volume 12, Issue 4, 12/2014, pp. 59–77, Wydawnictwo Koźmiński University, .
 Sułkowski, Łukasz (2012), Organizational Culture and the Trend of Critical Management Studies,, [in:] Journal of Intercultural Management, Tom 4, Nr 1/2012, pp. 91–101, Łódź: Wydawnictwo Społeczna Akademia Nauk, .
 Sułkowski, Łukasz (2014), The functionalist understanding of culture in management,, [in:] Organizacja i Kierowanie, nr 1B (160)/2014, Cyfert, Szymon (red.), pp. 25–36, Warszawa: Wydawnictwo Komitet Nauk Organizacji i Zarządzania Polskiej Akademii Nauk PAN, Szkoła Główna Handlowa w Warszawie, .
 Sułkowski, Łukasz (2013), Metodologia zarządzania – od fundamentalizmu do pluralizmu, [in:] Podstawy metodologii badań w naukach o zarządzaniu, Wydanie II rozszerzone i uaktualnione, Czakon, Wojciech (ed.), pp. 26–46, Warszawa: Wolters Kluwer, .
 Sułkowski, Łukasz (2013), Paradygmaty i teorie w naukach o zarządzaniu, [in:] Podstawy metodologii badań w naukach o zarządzaniu – wydanie II rozszerzone i uaktualnione, Czakon, Wojciech (ed.), pp. 268–290, Warszawa: Wolters Kluwer, .
 Sułkowski, Łukasz (2009), Interpretative Approach in Management Sciences, [in:] Argumenta Oeconomica, nr 2(23)/2009, pp. 127–149, Wrocław: Wydawnictwo Uniwersytetu Ekonomicznego we Wrocławiu, .
 Sułkowski, Łukasz, Seliga, Robert (2009), Application of Marketing Communication in the Work of General Practitioners, [in:] Clinical and Experimental Medical Letters, Vol. 50, Supl. A 2009, Okoński, Piotr (ed.), pp. 15, Warszawa: Wydawnictwo Medycyna Plus, e-.

Academic books 
 Rozkwitalska, Małgorzata, Sułkowski, Łukasz, Magala, Slawomir (ed.) (2017), Intercultural Interactions in the Multicultural Workplace. Traditional and Positive Organizational Scholarship, Cham: Wydawnictwo Springer International Publishing, .
 Sułkowski, Łukasz (ed.) (2016), Management and Culture of the University, Series: New Horizons in Management Sciences, Volume 6, Frankfurt am Main: Peter Lang International, .
 Raczkowski, Konrad, Sułkowski, Łukasz (ed.) (2014), Tax Management and Tax Evasion, Series: Horizons in Management Sciences, Volume 4, Frankfurt am Main: Wydawnictwo Peter Lang International, . 
 Sułkowski, Łukasz, Ignatowski, Grzegorz (ed.) (2017), Komunikacja i zarządzanie międzykulturowe. Współczesne wyzwania prawno-organizacyjne, Warszawa: Wydawnictwo Difin, .
 Sułkowski, Łukasz, Kożuch, Barbara (ed.) (2015), Instrumentarium zarządzania publicznego, Warszawa: Difin, .
 Otto, Jacek, Sułkowski, Łukasz (ed.) (2014), Metody zarządzania marketingowego, Warszawa: Wydawnictwo Difin, .
 Sułkowski, Łukasz, Sikorski, Czesław (ed.) (2014), Metody zarządzania kulturą organizacyjną, Wydawnictwo Difin, .

References

External links 
 http://www.sulko.pl/

1972 births
Living people
Jagiellonian University alumni
Academic staff of Jagiellonian University
Academic staff of the Wrocław University of Economics
University of Łódź alumni